Thiotricha obvoluta is a moth of the family Gelechiidae. It was described by Edward Meyrick in 1918. It is found in Assam, India.

The wingspan is about 11 mm. The forewings are fuscous with an elongate dark fuscous patch extending along the dorsum from the base to near the tornus, the upper edge with an oblique-triangular prominence before the middle of the wing, edged with lighter suffusion before and beyond this. There is a slender dark fuscous longitudinal streak in the disc posteriorly, partially pale edged beneath, as well as an oblique whitish strigula from the costa at four-fifths, and traces of a fine leaden-metallic transverse line beyond it. Three whitish dots are separated by dark fuscous on the costa towards the apex, the last edging a black apical dot. The hindwings are dark grey.

References

Moths described in 1918
Taxa named by Edward Meyrick
Thiotricha